Acartia is a genus of marine calanoid copepods. They are epipelagic, estuarine, zooplanktonic  found throughout the oceans of the world, primarily in temperate regions.

Classification 

This genus contains the majority of species in the family Acartiidae:

Acartia adriatica Steuer, 1910
Acartia amboinensis Carl, 1907
Acartia arbruta Smith et al., 2021
Acartia australis Farran, 1936
Acartia bacorehuisensis Zamora-Sánchez & Gómez-Aguirre, 1986
Acartia bermudensis Esterly, 1911
Acartia bifilosa (Giesbrecht, 1881)
Acartia bilobata Abraham, 1970
Acartia bispinosa Carl, 1907
Acartia bowmani Abraham, 1976
Acartia cagayanensis Sakaguchi & Ueda, 2020
Acartia californiensis Trinast, 1976
Acartia centrura Giesbrecht, 1889
Acartia chilkaensis Sewell, 1919
Acartia clausi Giesbrecht, 1889
Acartia danae Giesbrecht, 1889
Acartia denticornis Brady, 1883
Acartia discaudata (Giesbrecht, 1882)
Acartia dweepi Haridas & Madhupratap, 1978
Acartia edentata Srinui, Ohtsuka & Metillo in Srinui, Ohtsuka, Metillo & Nishibori, 2019
Acartia ensifera Brady, 1899
Acartia enzoi Crisafi, 1974
Acartia erythraea Giesbrecht, 1889
Acartia fancetti McKinnon, Kimmerer & Benzie, 1992
Acartia floridana Davis, 1948
Acartia forcipata I. C. Thompson & A. Scott in Thompson, Scott & Herdman, 1898
Acartia forticrusa Soh, Moon, Park, Bun & Venmathi Maran, 2013
Acartia fossae Gurney, 1927
Acartia hongi Soh & Suh, 2000
Acartia hudsonica Pinhey, 1926
Acartia italica Steuer, 1910
Acartia japonica Mori, 1940
Acartia jilletti Bradford, 1976
Acartia laxa Dana, 1852
Acartia lefevreae Bradford, 1976
Acartia levequei Grice, 1964
Acartia lilljeborgii Giesbrecht, 1889
Acartia limpida Dana, 1849
Acartia longiremis (Lilljeborg, 1853)
Acartia longisetosa Brady, 1914
Acartia macropus Cleve, 1900
Acartia margalefi Alcaraz, 1976
Acartia mediterranea Pesta, 1909
Acartia mollicula Pavlova & Shmeleva, 2010
Acartia mossi (Norman, 1878)
Acartia nadiensis Lee, S, Soh & W. Lee, 2019
Acartia nana Brady, 1914
Acartia negligens Dana, 1849
Acartia ohtsukai Ueda & Bucklin, 2006
Acartia omorii Bradford, 1976
Acartia pacifica Steuer, 1915
Acartia pietschmani Pesta, 1912
Acartia plumosa T. Scott, 1894
Acartia ponteloides (Kritchagin, 1873)
Acartia ransoni Vaissière, 1954
Acartia remivagantis Oliveira, 1946
Acartia sarojus Madhupratap & Haridas, 1994
Acartia seshaiyai Subbaraju, 1968
Acartia simplex G. O. Sars, 1905
Acartia sinjiensis Mori, 1940
Acartia southwelli Sewell, 1914
Acartia spinata Esterly, 1911
Acartia spinicauda Giesbrecht, 1889
Acartia steueri Smirnov, 1936
Acartia teclae Bradford, 1976
Acartia tonsa Dana, 1849
Acartia tranteri Bradford, 1976
Acartia tropica Ueda & Hiromi, 1987
Acartia tsuensis ItoTak, 1956
Acartia tumida Willey, 1920

Reproductive and life cycle

Female Acartia release eggs freely in the water. Nauplii hatch and undergo six distinct life stages to become copepodites and then undergo another six life stages to become fully mature copepods.

Some species of Acartia are known to exhibit a diapause, a resting period when the species is dormant, as a part of their life cycle. These species produce "resting eggs" when environmental conditions are unfavorable for the development and growth of nauplii. Individual females can switch between producing resting eggs and subitaneous eggs (eggs that hatch immediately) as environmental conditions change. Resting eggs accumulate in the sediment and hatch when conditions are optimal. Production of resting eggs is driven by water temperature variations. Some species (A. hudsonica) produce resting eggs when water temperatures rise above a certain threshold, while others (A. tonsa, A. califoriensis) have been observed to produce resting eggs when water temperatures fall below a certain threshold. Hatching and development of the species occur when the water cools (A. hudonica) or warms (A. tonsa, A. califoriensis). Additionally, A. califoriensis is known to be adapted to anomalous water temperature variations. Hatching is only followed by a period of steady water temperatures in the favorable range. This ensures that a generation of the species is not killed off by a momentary warming followed again by colder temperatures.

Diet

Acartia primarily feed on phytoplankton and are also known to consume rotifers, ciliates, and their own eggs and nauplii.

Acartia feeding patterns are asymptotic relative to the abundance of food. When food is widely abundant Acartia approach a maximum food intake. When there is less food available, feeding adjusts to rates that correlate with food availability.

Behaviour

In a study of A. tonsa in the Narragansett Bay the species was found to exhibit a diel feeding pattern, that is, a night feeding pattern. The diel feeding cycle was tested under a variety of light conditions and was found to be endogenous, not related to light availability, but persistent regardless of whether the copepods were subjected to light or dark. This feeding pattern is only known to be disrupted at extremely low food levels, implying that either "food limitation has over-ridden other factors governing diel feeding rhythms and induced continuous feeding, or that a synchronized population-wide feeding rhythm has given way to intermittent, asynchronous feeding among individuals."

Acartia are also known to exhibit a diel vertical migration pattern, swimming to depths during the day and rising to surface waters at night. The diel vertical migration of A. tonsa was seen to be effected by light exposure: when exposed to continuous light the copepods did not migrate to the surface.

Both diel patterns are thought to be primarily adaptive behavior to avoid visual predators. The mechanism of the diel vertical migration of Acartia has been explored further to solve the question of whether the copepods react to chemical signals indicating the presence of predators, physical stimuli resulting from the movement of predator fish in the water, or visual cues based on the changing light modified by a much larger predator. In a study of A. hudsonica, the chemical response was ruled out. Additionally, other studies of Acartia (A. longiremis, A. grani and A. discandata) were found to have less chemoreceptors and more mechanoreceptive sensory hairs than other marine copepods, suggesting that diel feeding and migration patterns in Arcatia are primarily driven by physical and visual cues.

References

Calanoida
Copepod genera
Taxa named by James Dwight Dana